Gilgen is a surname. Notable people with the surname include:

Hans Gilgen (1906–1980), Swiss cyclist
Jamie Gilgen (born 1981), Canadian cyclist
Philipp Gilgen (born 1976), Swiss swimmer

See also
St. Gilgen, a village in Salzburg, Austria